The Colorado Springs Stock Exchange was a regional stock exchange located in Colorado Springs, Colorado.  It was formed as a successor to the Colorado Springs Mining Exchange.  It closed in January 1967.  The building where it was located is now The Mining Exchange, a property in the Wyndham hotel chain.

References

Companies based in Colorado Springs, Colorado
Stock exchanges in the United States